Proneva is a rural locality (a village) in Yorgvinskoye Rural Settlement, Kudymkarsky District, Perm Krai, Russia. The population was 35 as of 2010.

Geography 
Proneva is located 14 km northeast of Kudymkar (the district's administrative centre) by road. Samchikova is the nearest rural locality.

References 

Rural localities in Kudymkarsky District